Vishal Garg (born 1977 or 1978) is an Indian-American entrepreneur. He is the chief executive officer of mortgage lending company Better.com and previously co-founded the student loan company MyRichUncle.

Early life and education
Born in India, Garg moved to the Queens borough of New York City when he was seven, and grew up in Forest Hills. While attending the academic magnet Stuyvesant High School in Manhattan, he resold books, CliffsNotes study guides, and thrift store clothes at a profit. Beginning in 1995 he studied finance and international business in the Stern School of Business at New York University while working as a runner and entry clerk for Salomon Brothers and as a trader for VZB Partners, a hedge fund. After graduation, he worked for a short time for Morgan Stanley.

Career

MyRichUncle
With Raza Khan, a fellow Indian immigrant whom he met in high school and who studied computer science in the same class at New York University, Garg founded a mortgage investment company in 2000 that became the online student loan provider MyRichUncle. Khan's brother provided an initial capital investment. For their analysis-based approach to tailoring loan rates to different applicants, in 2006 Garg and Khan were listed in both Fast Companys Fast 50 and Business Weeks Young Entrepreneurs of Tech.

Embark, Future Finance, Climb Credit, and EIFC
MyRichUncle was caught up in the repercussions of the subprime mortgage crisis and its parent company, MRU Holdings, declared Chapter 7 bankruptcy in 2009. Garg and Khan continued to operate Embark, a provider of admissions software to higher education that MRU Holdings had purchased in 2007. Beginning in August 2009, they also jointly led a new asset-backed securities team at Aram Global, an asset recovery firm. Garg later co-founded two further student loan companies: Future Finance, a provider of student loans to students in the UK, with Brian Norton in 2013, and Climb Credit, targeted at US programs with relatively lower costs and higher graduate employment rates, with Zander Rafael and Amit Sinha in 2014.

Garg and Khan also used features of the software developed for MyRichUncle to start EIFC, a company that analyzed loan portfolios to identify potentially problematic loans. Khan came to believe that Embark was misusing funds and that Garg was siphoning money from EIFC, resigned from both, and in 2013 filed a lawsuit against Garg. Garg later filed a counterclaim against Khan for mismanagement and theft of funds.

Better.com
In 2014, after a frustrating experience obtaining a mortgage, Garg founded Better.com, an online mortgage broker backed by venture capital; at an early stage, he acquired Avex Funding of California to bolster the new company in the continuing aftermath of the financial crisis. In August 2021, The Daily Beast estimated his equity in Better.com to be worth at least $1 billion.

Khan alleged that Garg misappropriated both funds and proprietary software to launch Better.com, and a group of investors also filed suit alleging diversion of funds through a venture capital firm founded by Garg called 1/0 Capital. Khan's claim of fraud was dismissed in May 2018. In a deposition in December 2019 in his counter-suit against Khan, court documents state that Garg threatened to "staple him against a fucking wall and burn him alive"; Garg apologized later in the same session.

Garg's treatment of employees has attracted negative publicity. In November 2020, Forbes quoted an e-mail in which he chided them as "a bunch of DUMB DOLPHINS". In December 2021, a video was widely disseminated of him abruptly firing 900 people in the United States and India through a videoconferencing call shortly before Christmas. Following public outrage, Garg apologized and wrote in a letter to employees that he had "failed to show the appropriate amount of respect and appreciation for the individuals who were affected". He stepped back as CEO, returning in January 2022 after the company conducted a review of its internal culture. A video subsequently emerged of Garg blaming himself for "overhir[ing]", and a second round of layoffs took place in March 2022 after Garg's return, with the company later also offering 60-day severance packages to employees who voluntarily resigned.

In June 2022, a former senior executive at Better.com filed a lawsuit alleging that Garg misled investors in its financial filings and other representations while it tried to go public.

Personal life
According to OpenSecrets, Garg has made numerous donations to the Democratic Party and its candidates.

See also 
 Indians in the New York City metropolitan area

References

External links 
 Personal website

Living people
Year of birth uncertain
1970s births
20th-century American businesspeople
21st-century American businesspeople
American chief executives
Chief executives in the finance industry
Indian emigrants to the United States
People from Queens, New York
Stuyvesant High School alumni
New York University Stern School of Business alumni